Daniel Ichbiah is a French author of several books on musical and technical topics. He has written a biography of Bill Gates which was published in some fifteen countries and also a big book about robots, which appeared in the US and Germany as well as in France. He has also written biographies of Madonna, the Rolling Stones, the Beatles, Coldplay and also various French artists.

Books written
 Robots: From Science Fiction to Technological Revolution (2005) . This reference book covers topics such as robots being portrayed in movies, toy robots, robots made from Lego, and robotic surgery setups.
 The Making of Microsoft: How Bill Gates and His Team Created the World's Most Successful Software Company (1991) 

In French:
 Les 4 vies de Steve Jobs French biography of Steve Jobs. Leduc, 2011.
 La saga des jeux vidéo The history of videogames.1997, 1998, 2004, 2009–2010, 2012 (Pix'n love).
 Bill Gates et la saga de Microsoft The biography of Bill Gates realised from interviews of Gates and various collaborators. Pocket, 1995.
 Generation MP3 Mille et une nuits, 2000. A book about MP3 revolution and bands like Nataraj xt.
 Madonna, Pop Confessions A Madonna biography. City Editions, 2006
 Comment Google mangera le monde The story and analysis of the Google phenomenon. L'Archipel, 2007
 Rolling Stones, l'Intégrale All about the Rolling Stones. City Editions, 2006
 Enigma, A book of enigma with a medieval style. City Editions, 2007

Also videogame guides for Myst, and software guides for Pro Tools, Windows Live Messenger, PHP, Cubase, etc.

External links

Blog
Videos by Daniel Ichbiah
Various articles written byDaniel Ichbiah : iPod saga, interview of Bertignac...
Videogame chronicles on CD News
Vidéo : Daniel Ichbiah as a guitarist
Articles on Agoravox

Living people
Year of birth missing (living people)
French technology writers
French music critics
French male non-fiction writers
French writers